Nijemci is a village and a municipality in the Vukovar-Syrmia County in Croatia.

In the 2011 census, there were 4,705 inhabitants in the municipality, 87.78% of which were Croats. The second largest ethnic group are Serbs who live mainly in two villages in the north of the municipality. There are only 0.06% aforementioned Germans living in this municipality.

Languages and names 

The village's name means "Germans" in Croatian.  The root of the word "" means "mute", and is a known Slavonic ethnonym for the name of the Germans.

Before World War II there was a substantial Danube Swabian minority resident here. They were expelled from Yugoslavia along with other ethnic Germans after the Second World War.

In villages Šidski Banovci and Vinkovački Banovci, along with Croatian which is official in the whole country, as a second official language has been introduced Serbian language with Cyrillic script.

Geography
Municipality is located in the historical regions of Syrmia. Municipality's total area is 224.68 km2. Rivers Spačva i Bosut flows through the municipality. The village of Nijemci is connected with the rest of the country via the D57 road while other important transit routes in the municipality include A3 motorway, M104 railway and the D46 state road. The territory of the municipality is completely flat very fertile black soil.

Climate and weather
Nijemci municipality has a moderately warm and rainy continental climate as defined by the Köppen climate classification. Due to the influence of continentality temperature differences within one year are more pronounced than in the rest of country.

Population

Municipality of Nijemci have a 4705 inhabitants according to 2011 Census. 1605 were living in the village of Nijemci at that time.

Economy

Nijemci is underdeveloped municipality which is statistically classified as the First Category Area of Special State Concern by the Government of Croatia.

Education

Local elementary school for the first eight grades operate in the village of Nijemci since the 1760.

Settlements
The following settlements comprise the Nijemci municipality:

Notable natives and residents
Mile Dedaković, retired Croatian Army colonel
Nikica Valentić, Prime Minister of Croatia from 1993 to 1995
Slobodan Bajić Paja, born in Banovci, People's Hero of Yugoslavia
Günter Stock, born in Banovci, president of the Berlin-Brandenburg Academy of Sciences and Humanities 2006-2015, Union of the German Academies of Sciences and Humanities 2008-2015, and the All European Academies 2012-2018)

References

External links

 Official website of Nijemci  

Municipalities of Croatia
Populated places in Syrmia
Populated places in Vukovar-Syrmia County